Down Bound Train is a song written by Chuck Berry. It was inspired by Berry's "fire and brimstone" religious upbringing. Both of his parents were staunch Baptists and sang in the Antioch Church Choir, which rehearsed at his home.

It is a song about redemption and a warning against alcohol abuse. A man who has too much to drink falls asleep on a bar room floor and has a vivid dream about riding a train, which is driven by the devil. When the man wakes up he renounces the drink.

"Down Bound Train" was released in December 1955 as the B Side of "No Money Down". The title is sometimes given as "The Down Bound Train" or "Downbound Train."

It is one of the first rock records to employ fade-in and fade-out.
Negativland performed and recorded "Hellbound Plane" in concert; it is a parody of "Downbound Train" and suggested fictional character Dick Vaughn had died in a plane crash.

Cover versions
In 2020, Vika and Linda cover the song for their album, Sunday (The Gospel According to Iso).  Covered by George Thorogood and the Destroyers, and renamed Hellbound Train, on their 1999 album Half a Boy/Half a Man.

References

1955 songs
Chuck Berry songs
Songs about trains
Fiction about the Devil
Songs written by Chuck Berry